The Rolls-Royce Wraith (not to be confused with the earlier small horsepower Goshawk-powered car, the 25/30 h.p) was built by Rolls-Royce at their Derby factory from 1938 to 1939 and supplied to independent coachbuilders as a rolling chassis.

Wraith is also the name of a new coupé announced by Rolls-Royce in 2013.

Wraith is an old Scottish word meaning "ghost" or "spirit", continuing Rolls-Royce's (at the time) new nomenclature that they had adopted, using words relating to silent, gracious, elegant, rarely seen and highly sought after for these reasons. In fact, the Wraith name originated from a 40/50 h.p, (Silver Ghost) that was named "The Wraith" by its original owner.

Chassis design

The in-line six cylinder, overhead valve, 4,257 cc engine was based on that of the 25/30 but featured a cross-flow cylinder head. The four-speed gearbox had synchromesh on second, third and fourth speeds and retained the traditional right hand change. The later engines were used as the basis for the Bentley MK V and the Corniche.

The Wraith featured an independent coil sprung front suspension based on Packard 120 retaining semi elliptical leaf springs on the rear axle.  The hydraulic dampers at the front had their damping rate controlled by governor and so varied with the speed of the car, making it superior to its predecessor, the 25/30 H.P. and on par with the Phantom III. The car was still built on a separate chassis but this was now of welded rather than the traditional riveted construction.  The drum brakes were assisted by a mechanical servo driven by the engine patented by Hispano-Suiza and built by Rolls-Royce under licence. Wire wheels of 17 inch diameter were fitted, with the spokes usually covered by removable discs. A built in hydraulic jacking system was fitted operated by a lever under the passenger seat.

Performance

Cars based on the Wraith chassis could reach ; this was very dependent on the weight and style of body fitted. In one test by "The Motor" magazine in October 1938, a 0–50 mph time of 16.4 seconds was recorded.

Production

In 1938, a typical touring car cost £1700, which included the chassis cost of £1100. 492 chassis were made. Although chassis were only produced in 1939, cars bearing 1940 or later delivery and registration dates are not uncommon.  Some cars were finished off during early 1940. Others were held in storage and sold and first registered during the war years. A few were actually bodied during wartime. In addition, 16 prewar chassis were bodied in early 1946 and duly delivered to the government. The final Wraith was delivered in 1947.

Film and book appearances

Rolls-Royce Wraiths are featured in My Favorite Brunette (1947) and in a brief scene of Johnny Dangerously (1984).
The eponymous registration plate of the novel and TV series NOS4A2 belongs to a Rolls-Royce Wraith.
A Rolls-Royce Wraith is also featured in The Man from U.N.C.L.E. episode 'The Foxes and Hounds Affair' (season 2, episode 4).
The vampire Lara Raith temporarily provides wizard Harry Dresden with the use of a 1939 Rolls-Royce Wraith in Turn Coat.
A 1948 Rolls-Royce Silver Wraith (the successor to the Wraith) appeared in the James Bond movie "Spectre". It came to pick up James bond and Mr. White's daughter, Dr Swan from the train station in Tangier to take them to Blofeld's compound.
A Rolls-Royce Wraith is featured on the stage of Tyler, the Creator’s Call Me If You Get Lost Tour.

See also
Rolls-Royce Silver Wraith

References

Wraith (1938)
1930s cars
Cars introduced in 1938